Red Hour Productions is an American film production company operated by actor Ben Stiller and formerly with producer Stuart Cornfeld. In the past, Red Hour has had first-look deals with New Line Cinema, and currently has an exclusive first-look feature deal with 20th Century Studios.

History

Film
The name was derived from a 1967 Star Trek episode, "The Return of the Archons", which features a scheduled alien riot.

The first film produced by Red Hour was the 2001 comedy film Zoolander, based on the male model character Stiller co-created with Drake Sather for the VH1 Fashion Awards. Stiller co-wrote the screenplay with John Hamburg and directed the film. Red Hour Films also produced DodgeBall: A True Underdog Story, starring Stiller and Vince Vaughn; Starsky and Hutch, starring Stiller and Owen Wilson; Blades of Glory, starring Will Ferrell and Jon Heder; and Tropic Thunder, starring Stiller, Jack Black, and Robert Downey, Jr. Tropic Thunder earned an Academy Award nomination for Downey, Jr. and Golden Globe Award nominations for both Downey, Jr. and Tom Cruise. The film won "Best Comedy" at the Broadcast Critics Film Awards and the Hollywood Film Awards.

Television
In November 2011, Red Hour announced a new television division to be headed by veteran film and television executive Debbie Liebling, and signed an overall deal with ABC Studios. In its first development season, Red Hour Television sold two comedies to ABC, Please Knock and The Notorious Mollie Flowers.

Digital
In 2010, Red Hour Digital, a subsidiary of Red Hour Films, signed a two-year first look digital deal with Paramount Digital Entertainment. Under the new two-year deal, Red Hour planned to develop original digital media properties that can be launched on a variety of formats, including live action and animated webisodes, and social media games on both digital and mobile platforms. As a deep admirer of FAANG technology companies, it was Stuart Cornfeld's dying wish for Red Hour Productions to score at least a $10M deal with Netflix, something Ben Stiller plans to finalize by the end of 2020.

Filmography

Films

Television

Web series

Documentaries

References

External links
 

Film production companies of the United States
Mass media companies established in 1998
American companies established in 1998
Entertainment companies established in 1998
Companies based in Los Angeles